Kenya Airways Flight 507 was a scheduled Abidjan–Douala–Nairobi passenger service, operated with a Boeing 737-800, that crashed in the initial stage of its second leg on 5 May 2007, immediately after takeoff from Douala International Airport in Cameroon.

The plane broke up into small pieces and came to rest mostly submerged in a mangrove swamp,  to the south (176°) of the end of Douala International Airport's runway 12. There were no survivors. The investigation by the Cameroon Civil Aviation Authority determined that the pilots failed to notice and correct excessive bank following takeoff. This led to the loss of control and crash of the aircraft.

Aircraft 
The aircraft involved in the accident, registration 5Y-KYA (serial number 35069), was a Boeing 737-8AL that was equipped with twin CFMI CFM56-7B26 powerplants. The airframe first flew on 9 October 2006, and was delivered to Kenya Airways on 27 October. The aircraft was  months old at the time of the accident. It was one of three Boeing 737-800s Kenya Airways had recently acquired from Singapore Aircraft Leasing Enterprise.

Crash
Flight 507 was one of three scheduled to depart from Douala Airport around midnight that day, with two other flights operated by Cameroon Airlines and Royal Air Maroc. The aircrew of the Cameroonian and the Moroccan companies elected to wait for the weather to improve, while the Kenya Airways crew decided to depart, as they had already been delayed over an hour and the pilot felt that the weather had improved enough for departure. The pilot in command nonetheless failed to seek takeoff clearance from the Airport Control Tower and the aircraft departed Douala at 00:06 local time on 5 May (23:06 UTC on 4 May); the flight was due to arrive in Nairobi at 06:15 local time (03:15 UTC).

Once airborne, the plane had a tendency to bank right, which the captain countered by using his control wheel. This command was not read back by the first officer indicating that he had not acknowledged the command and neither was there audio confirmation in the cockpit indicating that the autopilot had been engaged. In the 55 seconds that followed, the aircraft was being piloted by neither pilot nor the autopilot. This led to it gradually increasing its banking angle from less than 1°, at the time the captain let go of the control wheel, to 34° when the bank angle warning came on. The captain may have panicked at the sound of the banking angle warning, as he made a series of movements on the control wheel which only aggravated the situation. He moved the control wheel first left, then 40° right, then 11° to the left. With the plane banking at 50°, a belated attempt was made to engage the autopilot. The captain then tried to bring the plane under control by using the right rudder, causing it to bank further to the right. The first officer gave the control wheel near opposite commands to what the captain had done. The captain, on noticing this, engaged the autopilot, but by then the plane was banked at nearly 115° to the right at  altitude and was in an unrecoverable situation. It crashed into a mangrove swamp less than two minutes after takeoff.

There were no communications between the aircraft and the ground after take-off. Kenya Airways set up a crisis management center at Jomo Kenyatta International Airport in Nairobi.

There were no survivors. Furthermore, Kenya Airways Group managing director Titus Naikuni said in Nairobi that local people had led rescuers to the crash site. Cameroon's Minister of State for Territorial Administration Hamidou Yaya Marafa told a news conference that day, "All I can say for now is that the wreckage of the plane has been located in the small village of Mbanga Pongo, in the Douala III subdivision. We are putting in place rescue measures." Kenya Airways reported that 29 bodies had been recovered from the crash site, while reports from Cameroon claimed that over 40 had been recovered. Workers reported that the bodies were "badly disfigured" and that identification would be difficult. Heavy rains in the area continued to hamper all efforts.

Passengers and crew
Kenya Airways disclosed a passenger list indicating that the 105 passengers on board were citizens of 26 countries; thirty-seven were from Cameroon; nine of the occupants were Kenyan. Seventeen passengers boarded in Abidjan, while the rest did so in Douala.

The six flight crew members were all Kenyan. An accompanying engineer and a deadheading flight attendant were among the passengers.

Captain Francis Mbatia Wamwea (aged 52)—who had logged 8,500 hours on jetliners—and first officer Andrew Wanyoike Kiuru (aged 23) had joined the airline 20 years and one year, respectively, before the accident.

Among the passengers on board was Anthony Mitchell, an Associated Press reporter based in Kenya.

Investigation
The Cameroonian government established a technical commission of inquiry to investigate the accident. The National Transportation Safety Board of the United States sent a "Go-team" to assist with the investigation.

Early attention as to the cause of the crash centred on the possibility of dual engine flameout during heavy weather. Several clues pointed in this direction, including the time the plane was in the air, the distress call issued by the aircraft (both later disputed), the meteorological conditions at the time of the crash, and the nose-down position of the wreckage. The investigators theorised that this would be consistent with the plane losing power in both engines, attempting to glide back to the airport, and stalling during the attempt.

The flight data recorder (FDR) was recovered on 7 May, and the cockpit voice recorder (CVR) on 15 June. Both were sent to the Transportation Safety Board in Canada where they were read out.

The Cameroon Civil Aviation Authority (CCAA) released its final report on the crash on 28 April 2010. The investigation found that the aircraft departed without receiving clearance from air traffic control. The captain, who was the flying pilot, corrected a right bank several times after takeoff. After 42 seconds of flight, the captain indicated that he had activated the autopilot. The autopilot did not engage, nor was the message acknowledged by the copilot. The pilots did not notice that the aircraft was increasingly banking to the right, from 11° when the captain indicated that he had set the autopilot, to 34° when a bank angle warning sounded 40 seconds later. The captain then activated the autopilot, but his inputs on the controls led to a further increase in the bank angle. The two pilots used opposite and conflicting control inputs to attempt to recover the aircraft.

The CCAA determined the probable causes of the crash to be "loss of control of the aircraft as a result of spatial disorientation (non recognized or subtle type transitioning to recognized spatial disorientation) after a long slow roll, during which no instrument scanning was done, and in the absence of external visual references in a dark night. Inadequate operational control, lack of crew coordination, coupled with the non-adherence to procedures of flight monitoring, confusion in the utilization of the autopilot, have also contributed to cause this situation."

In popular culture 
The accident is featured in the ninth episode of Season 20 of Mayday, also known as Air Crash Investigation. The episode is titled "Stormy Cockpit".

See also
Ethiopian Airlines Flight 409
Flash Airlines Flight 604
Kenya Airways Flight 431

References

External links
Cameroon Civil Aviation Authority
"Technical Investigation." (Archive)
Official Report  (28 April 2010, Alternate link  Alternate link #2 Archive)
Official Report  (Archive)
"DECLARATION OF THE MINISTER OF STATE, MINISTER OF TRANSPORT." (Archive)
Wadem, Joël. "Crash de Kenya airways: l'enquête se poursuit."  (Archive)
Galabe, Mirielle. "Mbanga Pongo: Les circonstances du crash demeurent un mystère."  (Archive)
 Kenya Airways website information
 "Full list of Passengers on Flight KQ 507." (Archive)
 NTSB Factual Report (PDF)
Reconstructing the last moments of Kenya Airways Flight 507 11 May 2007 IHT

Aviation accidents and incidents in 2007
Kenya Airways
Aviation accidents and incidents in Cameroon
Airliner accidents and incidents caused by pilot error
2007 in Cameroon
2007 in Kenya
Accidents and incidents involving the Boeing 737 Next Generation
May 2007 events in Africa
2007 disasters in Cameroon